The 1981 Copa Libertadores de América Finals was the final two-legged tie to determine the Copa Libertadores de América champion. It was contested by Brazilian club Flamengo and Chilean club Cobreloa. The first leg of the tie was played on 13 November at Flamengo's home field, with the second leg played on 20 November at Cobreloa's.

Flamengo won the series after winning a tie-breaking playoff 2-0 at Montevideo's Estadio Centenario. Thus, the Brazilian team achieved its first Copa Libertadores trophy.

Qualified teams

Both teams came into the finals as first-time finalists of the Copa Libertadores.

Format
The finals will be played over two legs; home and away. The team that accumulates the most points —two for a win, one for a draw, zero for a loss— after the two legs will be crowned the champion. If the two teams are tied on points after the second leg, a playoff in a neutral venue will become the next tie-breaker. Goal difference is going to be used as a last resort.

Venues

Match details

First leg

Second leg

Playoff

References

1981 in South American football
1981
Copa
Copa
CR Flamengo matches